Events from the year 1329 in the Kingdom of Scotland.

Incumbents
Monarch – Robert I (until 7 June), then David II

Events
 7 June – Robert I dies, to be succeeded by his 5-year-old son, David II

See also

 Timeline of Scottish history

References

 
Years of the 14th century in Scotland
Wars of Scottish Independence